The Reluctant Traveler is a British travel documentary comedy television series on Apple TV+. The series follows Canadian actor Eugene Levy, who travels to remarkable hotels around the world and explores the places and cultures surrounding them. The series premiered on February 24, 2023.

Episodes
The series consists of eight episodes and visits locations in Costa Rica, Finland, Italy, Japan, Maldives, Portugal, South Africa and the United States.

Release
On December 13, 2022, Apple TV+ announced that the series will premiere on February 24, 2023.

See also
 The Accidental Tourist (film)

References

External links
  – official site
 

English-language television shows
2020s British documentary television series
2023 British television series debuts
Apple TV+ original programming
Documentary television series about music
2020s British travel television series
Television series by ITV Studios